Cam Guthrie is a Canadian politician, currently serving as the Mayor of Guelph, Ontario since December 1, 2014. In the October 24, 2022 municipal election, he was re-elected mayor for a third term.

Personal life
Guthrie is a third-generation Guelphite born into a family with Scottish immigrant roots. His family includes a number of independent businessmen. Before entering politics, Guthrie was an insurance agent. His father was a chiropractor, and his grandfather owned and operated Guthrie's Bakery in downtown Guelph, started by his great-grandfather in 1919. He also served on the boards of some local not-for-profit organizations. Guthrie had previously graduated with a business diploma from Sir Sandford Fleming College.

He has been a drummer for the local bands, including the synth-pop musical group Fitness Club Fiasco, and has been involved in the production of several music albums. Fitness Club Fiasco were finalists in CBC Music's Searchlight competition in 2014. He is the cousin of musician Jim Guthrie.

Guthrie regularly attends services at Lakeside Church.

He and his wife Rachel have a son and a daughter.

Career in politics
Prior to his election to the mayoralty, Guthrie represented Ward 4 on Guelph City Council. Guthrie first ran for city councillor in 2006 but lost to Mike Salisbury by 194 votes. He ran again for councillor in 2010 and defeated Salisbury by 1,182 votes.

In the 2014 municipal election, Guthrie was elected mayor of Guelph, defeating incumbent mayor Karen Farbridge by 5,498 votes and claiming just over 50% of the popular vote. In his inaugural address, Guthrie stated that his priorities would continue to be limiting tax increases to the rate of inflation, reviewing the transit system, improving customer service at City Hall, and addressing an infrastructure deficit.

He was re-elected mayor in 2018 with 65.82% of the ballots, on a "A Stronger, Safer Community" platform which included a plan for greater investments in police services and infrastructure.

Guthrie was re-elected for mayor for third term in 2022.

Electoral record

References

1969 births
Mayors of Guelph
Living people
Canadian indie pop musicians
Canadian Plymouth Brethren
Musicians from Guelph